Thyrsotarsa is a genus of moths of the family Yponomeutidae.

Species
Thyrsotarsa platybyrsa - Meyrick, 1921 

Yponomeutidae